"Talk Shows on Mute" is a song by the American alternative rock band Incubus.  It was released as the second single from the band's 2004 album, A Crow Left of the Murder..., and peaked at #3 on the Billboard Modern Rock Tracks chart and #18 on the Mainstream Rock Tracks chart and also peaked at number 16 on the Bubbling Under Hot 100 Singles chart.

Background
The song has a mellow and stripped-down sound, with lyrics containing references to George Orwell's novel Nineteen Eighty-Four and Philip K. Dick's novel Do Androids Dream of Electric Sheep?.  Lead singer Brandon Boyd says the inspiration for the song came to him while watching a talk show on an airplane.

"I was on an airplane when a talk show began playing on the TVs. I decided to start narrating for the people, which is a really great game if you're ever bored enough. I realized a time will probably come when television will watch us if we're watching it, if that hasn't already happened, figuratively or literally. It sounded like some sort of pseudo-Big Brother nightmare, so I wrote it down."

Music video
The song's music video was directed by Floria Sigismondi, who also directed the band's "Megalomaniac" video.  The video alludes to another George Orwell novel, Animal Farm.  It depicts a world where animals have taken over, and the members of Incubus are shown on a talk show demonstrating "stupid human trix".

Track listing
US/EU CD Single
 Talk Shows On Mute
 Wish You Were Here (Live In Osaka, Japan)
 Talk Shows On Mute (Live In Osaka, Japan)
 Hello - BBC Radio 1 Version

Yellow 7"
Side A
 Talk Shows On Mute
 Here In My Room - BBC Radio 1 Version

Side B
 Vitamin - Live "Bootleg" Version - Osaka, Japan
 Hello - Live "Bootleg" Version - Osaka, Japan

Charts

References

2004 singles
Incubus (band) songs
Music videos directed by Floria Sigismondi
Music based on Nineteen Eighty-Four
Song recordings produced by Brendan O'Brien (record producer)
Rock ballads
2004 songs
Immortal Records singles
Songs written by Brandon Boyd
Songs written by Mike Einziger
Songs written by Ben Kenney
Songs written by Chris Kilmore
Songs written by José Pasillas
Songs about television